Xanlıqlar (known as Musaköy in the Soviet times and until 1994) is a village in the Qazakh Rayon of Azerbaijan. It has a population of 3,111.
Xanliqlar is a place in Azerbaijan about 245 mi (or 395 km) west of Baku, the country's capital city.

References 

Populated places in Qazax District